Bordeaux, also known as Estate Bordeaux, is a historic former sugar plantation located on the West End of Saint Thomas, U.S. Virgin Islands.  It was listed on the U.S. National Register of Historic Places in 1978.  The listing included three contributing buildings and a contributing structure.

King Christian V gave the estate to the Brandenburg Company in 1695. The estate was owned by several owners between 1739 and 1854, when it was sold to Rasmus Wilhelm Rasmussen, whose family then sold the estate (though not the Great House) to the V.I. Government in 1955.

In 1978 the buildings were in ruins. The former Great House of the plantation, in the West End Quarter, is a two-room building with plastered rubble walls, with a basement and with a porch along its south facade. It originally had a hipped roof which is gone. It has a one-story  addition on the west side, with a corrugated tin roof. Ruins of cisterns and outbuildings are nearby. A former mill building and factory are located some distance away from the great house. By the water is a one-room building  in plan, probably a sugar warehouse, with  rubble and coral block walls.

References

National Register of Historic Places in the United States Virgin Islands
Buildings and structures completed in 1730
Sugar plantations in the United States Virgin Islands
1730s establishments in the Caribbean
West End, Saint Thomas, U.S. Virgin Islands